Masum Shahriar is a Bangladeshi television director, screenwriter and writer.

Career 
Shahriar started his career as a writer on 1999. In his career, he wrote more than 300 hundred package drama.

Filmography

As a director
 Amader Pataka
 Tomar Theke Shuru
 Vulte Pari Na
 Lajjabati Laila Ebar Abhinetri Laila
 Mafe Kaira Dane
 Shikar
 Porom Premer Golpo

As a writer
 Ekahane Jibanananda Nei
 Aamma
 Ah Jibon
 Ghaliber Gappo
 Paraner Manush
 Ekdin Khujechhinu Jarey
 Poraner Manush
 La Perujer Surjasto

As a screenwriter
 Shohorer Sesh Bari

References

Living people
Bangladeshi directors
Bangladeshi screenwriters
Bangladeshi writers
1977 births